Beijingbei (Beijing North) railway station, formerly known as Xizhimen railway station, is a railway station in Beijing. It was built in 1905 as one of the original stations on the Jingzhang railway (part of the old Beijing–Baotou railway).

On October 31, 2016, the station closed for renovation. On December 30, 2019, the station becomes the terminus of the high-speed Beijing–Zhangjiakou intercity railway, which is a section of Beijing-Baotou passenger-dedicated line.

Renovation

The station was closed from November 1, 2016 to December 30, 2019. After the renovation began, the Line S2 terminus changed to Huangtudian railway station and all other China Railway train's terminus changed to Changping North railway station. From September 30, 2020, Beijing North railway station became the southern terminus of Huairou–Miyun line.

Public transportation

Beijing Subway
Beijing North railway station is located just outside Xizhimen station on Line 2, Line 4 and Line 13 of the Beijing Subway.

Bus
It is also connected to Beijing bus lines 16, 26, 85, 87, 438, 651 and 运通105.

References

Railway stations in Beijing
Railway stations in China opened in 1905